KWMV-LP (95.9 FM) was a radio station licensed to Westcliffe, Colorado, U.S.  The station was owned by Crystal Mountain Center For the Performing Arts.

KWMV-LP signed on in May 2004. The station went silent on September 12, 2015, and was replaced that month with KLZR (91.7 FM). On October 5, 2017, the Federal Communications Commission informed KWMV-LP that, as the station had been silent for over a year, it was in the process of cancelling the station's license; the license was canceled on November 6, 2017.

References

External links
 

WMV-LP
WMV-LP
Radio stations established in 2005
2005 establishments in Colorado
Radio stations disestablished in 2017
2017 disestablishments in Colorado
Defunct radio stations in the United States
Defunct community radio stations in the United States
WMV-LP